Sie7e + (stylized in all upper case) is the fifth studio album by Mexican singer Danna Paola, released on February 7, 2020, by Universal Music Mexico. The album contains the songs from Paola's previous EP, Sie7e (2019), including the smash-hits "Mala Fama" and "Final Feliz", and brand new tracks, including the singles "Oye Pablo", "Polo a Tierra" and "Sodio".

Track listing

Charts

Certifications

References

2020 albums
Danna Paola albums
Universal Music Mexico albums
Spanish-language albums
Latin pop albums